Beelaerts van Blokland is an old Dutch patrician family.

History
The family came originally from the Dutch town Oirschot. The oldest recorded member is a one Zeger Lycop who lived in the 14th century. His grandson Henric was the first to carry the name Beelaerts. The family belongs to the Dutch nobility since 1815 with the honorific of jonkheer.

Famous members 
Gerard Jacob Theodoor Beelaerts van Blokland (1843-1897), Speaker of the Dutch House of Representatives and envoy for the South African Republic
Frans Beelaerts van Blokland (1872-1956), Dutch envoy to China, Minister of Foreign Affairs, Vice-President of the Council of State
 Pieter Beelaerts van Blokland (1932-2021), Minister of Housing, Spatial Planning and the Environment, Mayor, Queen's Commissioner of the Province of Utrecht

Bibliography
Nederland's Patriciaat 58 (1972), pp. 15–39.
Nederland's Adelsboek 79 (1988), pp. 289–329.

References and sources 
 Hoge Raad van Adel
 Handboek der Wapenkunde, Rietstap, J.B. (1857)

Dutch_noble_houses